Lwandle (from a Zulu word meaning "ocean") is a township in Strand, a town in the eastern part of the Cape Town Metro in the Western Cape province of South Africa. Administratively it is a suburb of the City of Cape Town. Under Apartheid it was a group area for black people and is still predominantly populated by this community.

References

See also 
Lwandle Migrant Labour Museum

Suburbs of Cape Town
Townships in the Western Cape